Russellville High School is a comprehensive public high school established in 1893 serving the community of Russellville, Arkansas, United States. Located in Pope County and within the Russellville micropolitan area, Russellville High School is the sole high school managed by the Russellville School District and serves students in grades ten through twelve and its main feeder schools are Russellville Junior High School (grades 8-9) and Russellville Middle School (grades 6-7).

Curriculum 
The assumed course of study at Russellville High School is the Smart Core curriculum developed by the Arkansas Department of Education (ADE). Russellville High School was first accredited by the North Central Association in 1945, followed by accreditation by AdvancED when the NCA unified with AdvancED starting in 2009-10. Students engage in regular and Advanced Placement (AP) coursework and exams to obtain at least 22 units before graduation. Exceptional students have been recognized as National Merit Finalists and participated in Arkansas Governor's School.

Students who qualify may seek participation in the Arkansas School for Mathematics, Sciences, and the Arts (ASMSA), Odyssey of the Mind, and student competitions and festivals beyond the local district. Russellville High School performs weekly character education sessions and was the first High School in Arkansas to offer an introductory course on World Religions.

The school also promotes the Fine Arts. Known as the "Pride of Russellville," the Instrumental Program has consistently scored superior ratings in competitions as well as place a number of students in All-Region Band, Jazz Band, All-State Band, and All-State Jazz Band. The band has performed at three Inaugural Parades (1976, 1996, 2016) and holds the record for the most single band to perform for the inauguration. Along with the instrumental program, the choral program can boast "best of the best" and has been invited to perform at a National Choral Competition in 2018. The choral program also consistently scores superior in competitions as well as placing a number of students of All-Region and All-State Choir. Academically, the music program also offers courses in General Music, Advanced Placement Music Theory (one of the first programs in the state) and Music Technology.

Extracurricular activities 
The Russellville High School mascot is the cyclone and crimson and black serve as the school colors.

Athletics 
For the 2012-2014 seasons, the Russellville Crimson Cyclones participate in the state's second largest classification (6A) within the combined 6A/7A Central Conference. Competition is primarily sanctioned by the Arkansas Activities Association with the Cyclones competing in baseball, basketball (boys/girls), competitive cheer, cheer, cross country, competitive dance, dance, debate, football, golf (boys/girls), soccer (boys/girls), softball, speech, swimming (girls), tennis (boys/girls, track and field, volleyball, and wrestling.

RHS has won at least 40 state championships in its athletic history, the first in 1933 with football Cyclones being recognized by the Arkansas Activities Association as state champions. In 2014, the Cyclones won state Class 6A championships in baseball, volleyball, and boys soccer. The boys' track and field team won nine state championships between 1951 and 2012. In 2014, Russellville won its third state baseball championship (1993, 2001). In 2015, the Cyclones won their third Class 6A state boys soccer championship in the previous four years (2012, 2014, and 2015).

The Cyclones (12-1) won the 2016 State Class 6A football championship.

Notable alumni 
The following are notable people associated with Russellville High School. If the person was a Russellville High School student, the number in parentheses indicates the year of graduation; if the person was a faculty or staff member, that person's title and years of association are included:
 Scott Bradley—American composer most known for his works in Tom and Jerry (MGM) cartoons, was from Russellville.
 Natalie Canerday (1979)—Actress; roles include Sling Blade, October Sky, and Walk the Line.
Jeff Davis—Arkansas Governor (1901–07), U.S. Senator (1907–13).
 Elizabeth Ward Gracen (1979)—Actress; crowned 1982 Miss America and 1981 Miss Arkansas.
 Greg Horne (1983)—All-American kicker/punter; four-year letterman at Arkansas; NFL professional football player.
 Zach Hocker (2010)-all-time leading scorer at the University of Arkansas with 354 career points, played for New Orleans Saints and St. Louis Rams of the NFL
 Eddie Meador (1955)—NFL professional football player and six-time All-Pro selection.
 Greg Standridge (1985) — member of the Arkansas Senate for District 16, which includes Russellville 
 Corliss Williamson (1992)—former University of Central Arkansas basketball coach 2011-2013 (26-62); former NBA professional basketball player; 1992 Gatorade National Male Basketball Player of the Year Award
 Steve Womack (1975) — U.S. Representative for Arkansas's 3rd congressional district

References

External links 
 

1893 establishments in Arkansas
Educational institutions established in 1893
Public high schools in Arkansas
Schools in Pope County, Arkansas
Buildings and structures in Russellville, Arkansas